The qualifying rounds for the 2000–01 UEFA Champions League began on 12 July 2000. In total, there were three qualifying rounds which provided 16 clubs to join the group stage.

Teams

First qualifying round
The draw for this round was performed on 23 June 2000 in Geneva, Switzerland.

Seeding

Summary

|}

Matches

KR Reykjavík won 6–2 on aggregate.

Levski Sofia won 6–0 on aggregate.

2–2 on aggregate. Haka won on away goals.

Red Star Belgrade won 5–0 on aggregate.

Levadia Maardu won 6–2 on aggregate.

BATE Borisov won 3–2 on aggregate.

Shamkir won 5–3 on aggregate.

Shelbourne won 2–1 on aggregate.

Zimbru Chişinău won 6–4 on aggregate.

FBK Kaunas won 4–3 on aggregate.

Second qualifying round
The draw for this round was performed on 23 June 2000 in Geneva, Switzerland.

Seeding

Notes

Summary

|}

Matches

Anderlecht won 4–2 on aggregate.

Beşiktaş won 2–1 on aggregate.

Brøndby won 3–1 on aggregate.

Polonia Warsaw won 7–4 on aggregate.

Rangers won 4–1 on aggregate.

Inter Bratislava won 1–0 on aggregate.

Helsingborg won 3–0 on aggregate.

Red Star Belgrade won 4–2 on aggregate.

Shakhtar Donetsk won 9–2 on aggregate.

Slavia Prague won 5–1 on aggregate.

Rosenborg won 4–2 on aggregate.

Sturm Graz won 5–1 on aggregate.

Zimbru Chişinău won 2–1 on aggregate.

Dunaferr won 4–2 on aggregate.

Third qualifying round
The draw for this round was performed on 21 July 2000 in Nyon, Switzerland.

Seeding

Notes

Summary
Losing teams advanced to the first round of the 2000–01 UEFA Cup.

|}

Matches

Valencia won 4–1 on aggregate.

Sparta Prague won 2–0 on aggregate.

Hamburg won 2–0 on aggregate.

Helsingborg won 1–0 on aggregate.

Beşiktaş won 6–1 on aggregate.

Lyon won 4–2 on aggregate.

Anderlecht won 1–0 on aggregate.

Rangers won 6–0 on aggregate.

1–1 on aggregate. Dynamo Kyiv won on away goals.

Panathinaikos won 4–3 on aggregate.

Leeds United won 3–1 on aggregate.

Sturm Graz won 3–2 on aggregate.

Rosenborg won 4–3 on aggregate.

Galatasaray won 4–3 on aggregate.

Milan won 6–1 on aggregate.

Shakhtar Donetsk won 2–1 on aggregate.

Notes

External links 
 2000–01 season at UEFA website

Qualifying Rounds
2000-01